Ludowy Klub Sportowy Goczałkowice-Zdrój, commonly known as LKS Goczałkowice-Zdrój, is a football club located in Goczałkowice-Zdrój, Poland. They compete in the III liga, the fourth tier of the Polish football pyramid. Founded in 1960, they play their home matches at Panattoni Arena, formerly called Stadion Gminny.

History

Current squad

Notable players

Łukasz Piszczek 
The club has gained attention for being the childhood club of the long-term Poland international player Łukasz Piszczek. In April 2021, he agreed to join the club for the 2021–22 season following his departure from Borussia Dortmund, when he retired from professional football. His father is vice-president of LKS Goczałkowice-Zdrój. In May 2021, Piszczek coached the club for one III liga match against Pniówek Pawłowice, although it ended in a 2–1 defeat. 

Since 2019, Piszczek has been working to establish the Łukasz Piszczek BVB Academy in Goczałkowice-Zdrój, in partnership with Borussia Dortmund.

References 

Football clubs in Silesian Voivodeship
Association football clubs established in 1960
1960 establishments in Poland

External links
Official Website